The Manish Malhotra Show is an Indian talk show hosted by fashion designer Manish Malhotra, which premiered in 2005 on zOOm channel. The series was later syndicated on TV Asia USA.

The show features celebrity guests, industry moviemakers, and fashion tips. Some of the celebrities that have appeared on the show are: Sridevi, Urmila Matondkar, Smriti Irani, and so on.

References

External links

Indian television talk shows
2005 Indian television series debuts
2005 Indian television series endings
Zoom (Indian TV channel) original programming